Parori, formerly Beskeni (named after a local Ottoman-era agha) is a small village located about 27 kilometres north of Livadeia, the capital of Boeotia in Central Greece. Today, Parori is inhabited by only a small number of full-time residents, the main occupations of the inhabitants are with farming and livestock.

Etymology
Located east of Davleia at the foot of Mount Parnassus.
The village was named Bescheni until 1930, when it was renamed to Parori. With its stone houses, narrow cobbled streets, beautiful tiled roofs and traditional decorative elements, the village is a good example of traditional local architecture. It is worth seeing the traditional stone floors for cereals.

The name Parori become from two possible scenarios. The first theory posits that it derives from its location at the foot of Mount Parnassus (παρά το όρος, i.e. "near the mountain"), and the second from its location in the borders of two regional units Boeotia and Phthiotis (παρά τα όρια, "near the border").

Nearest places
Davleia, 7 km
Tithorea, 7 km
Chaeronea, 15 km
Livadeia, 27 km
Arachova, 28 km
Delfoi, 42 km
Lamia, 65 km

Population

History
The oldest testament of the village's existence is the church of St. Nicholas, which is dated by a stone inscription to 1360.

From 1930 to 1998, the village was a separate community. In 1998 it was integrated into the Municipality of Davleia, and with the 2011 Kallikratis plan, it came under the Municipality of Levadeia.

Transport 

See also
List of settlements in Boeotia

References

External links
Parori Village in www
ΠΑΡΟΡΙ ΒΟΙΩΤΙΑΣ (Parori Village) Facebook Account
Information to trip here.
Soultanis Panagiotis Facebook Account (birthplace)

Populated places in Boeotia